Clube Atlético Alto Vale, commonly known as Atlético Alto Vale, is a Brazilian football club based in Rio do Sul, Santa Catarina state.

History
The club was founded on October 21, 1995. They won the Campeonato Catarinense Second Level in 1996.
In 2000 won their greatest conquer: "returno Catarinão". 
In 2006 the club had licencied from professional football. In 2022 another professional team showed in the City, and Alto Vale's return became more distant. The newer professional team was: [](portuguese)

Achievements
 Campeonato Catarinense Second Level:
 Winners (1): 1996

Campeonato Catarinense Returno : 2000

Stadium
Clube Atlético Alto Vale play their home games at Estádio Alfredo João Krieck. The stadium has a maximum capacity of 8,000 people.

References

Association football clubs established in 1995
Football clubs in Santa Catarina (state)
1995 establishments in Brazil